The Dark Side of Fame with Piers Morgan is a BBC television series presented by Piers Morgan exploring the downside of fame. The show follows an interview format in which each episode is devoted to one particular celebrity figure who has seen the "dark side of fame". Morgan, a former tabloid editor, questions the guest on these experiences.  The show is similar in nature to another show Morgan previously presented on the BBC, You Can't Fire Me, I'm Famous!.

Episodes

Reception
The show has gained a negative critical reception.

References

External links

2000s British documentary television series
2008 British television series debuts
2008 British television series endings
BBC television documentaries
English-language television shows